Tony Sucipto (born 12 February 1986 in Surabaya, East Java), nicknamed Toncip, is an Indonesian professional footballer who plays for Liga 1 club Persija Jakarta. Mainly a defensive midfielder, he can also play as a left-back or a central defender.

Personal life
Tony is married with children. He is a Muslim who observes the Islamic month of Ramadan.

Club career

Persib Bandung
After a year at Persija Jakarta, in 2011, Tony signed for Persib Bandung. He scored his first two goals for Persib in a 5-1 win against Persita Tangerang in an Indonesia Super League match on 15 April 2013. In seven years, he made 173 league appearances and scored three goals.

Persija Jakarta
In 2019, Tony returned to Persija and made his league debut on 20 May 2019 against Barito Putera at the 17th May Stadium, Banjarmasin.

International goals
International under-23 goals

International goal

Honours

Club
Sriwijaya
 Liga Indonesia: 2007–08
 Piala Indonesia (3): 2007–08, 2008–09, 2010

Persib Bandung
 Indonesia Super League: 2014
 Indonesia President's Cup: 2015

 Persija Jakarta

 Menpora Cup: 2021

International 
Indonesia
AFF Championship runner-up: 2010

Individual
 Indonesia Soccer Championship A Best XI: 2016

References

External links
 

1989 births
Living people
Indonesian Muslims
Sportspeople from East Java
Sportspeople from Surabaya
Indonesian footballers
Association football utility players
Indonesia youth international footballers
Indonesia international footballers
Liga 1 (Indonesia) players
Persijatim players
Sriwijaya F.C. players
Persija Jakarta players
Persib Bandung players
Indonesian Super League-winning players
Footballers at the 2006 Asian Games
Association football fullbacks
Asian Games competitors for Indonesia